James Cerretani and Adil Shamasdin were the defending champions but lost in the first round to German Wildcards Kevin Krawietz and Hannes Wagner.
The title went to the 2nd seeded Germans Dustin Brown and Philipp Marx defeating Poles Piotr Gadomski and Mateusz Kowalczyk 7–6(7–4), 6–2.

Seeds

Draw

Draw

References
 Main Draw

Bauer Watertechnology Cup - Doubles
2013 Doubles